Scobicia declivis, known generally as the lead cable borer or short-circuit beetle, is a species of horned powder-post beetle in the family Bostrichidae. It is found in North America and Oceania.

References

Further reading

External links

 

Bostrichidae
Articles created by Qbugbot
Beetles described in 1860